The 1985–86 Buffalo Sabres season was the 16th season for the franchise in the National Hockey League (NHL). It saw the Sabres finish in last place in the Adams Division with a record of 37 wins, 37 losses, and 6 ties for 80 points. They missed the Stanley Cup Playoffs for the first time since 1974.

Pre-season

Regular season

Divisional standings

Schedule and results

Playoffs
The Sabres failed to qualify for the playoffs.

Player statistics

Skaters

Note: GP = Games played; G = Goals; A = Assists; Pts = Points; +/- = Plus/minus; PIM = Penalty minutes

Goaltenders
Note: GP = Games played; TOI = Time on ice (minutes); W = Wins; L = Losses; OT = Overtime losses; GA = Goals against; SO = Shutouts; SV% = Save percentage; GAA = Goals against average

Awards and records

Records

Milestones

Transactions

Trades

Free agents

Claimed from waivers

Draft picks
Buffalo's picks at the 1985 NHL Entry Draft.

Farm teams

References
 Sabres on Hockey Database

Buffalo Sabres seasons
Buffalo
Buffalo
Buffalo
Buffalo